U Thong is the district (amphoe) in the western part of Suphan Buri province, north of Bangkok.

History

Higham states, "U-Thong was occupied for many centuries prior to the development of the Dvaravati state.  Radiocarbon determinations from the sites of U-Thong and Chansen suggest that the transition into complex state societies in the Chao Phraya basin took place between about 300-600 AD."  A copper inscription from the mid-7th century states, "Sri Harshavarman, grandson of Ishanavarman, having expanded his sphere of glory, obtained the lion throne through regular succession," and mentions gifts to a linga.  The site includes a moat, 1,690 by 840 m, and the Pra Paton caitya.

It also became the origin of the Ayutthaya Kingdom, as the first King of Ayutthaya, Ramathibodi, was prince of U Thong when the city was struck by an epidemic, prompting him to relocate east and found Ayutthaya.

U Thong district was created with the name Chorakhe Sam Phan in 1905. In 1939 the district was renamed U Thong. In 1944, the government moved the centre of the district from Ban Chorakhe Sam Phan to the area of the ancient city.

Geography
Neighbouring districts are (from the north clockwise): Don Chedi, Mueang Suphan Buri, Bang Pla Ma, Song Phi Nong of Suphan Buri Province; Lao Khwan, Huai Krachao, and Phanom Thuan of Kanchanaburi province.

Administration

Central administration 
U Thong district is divided into 13 sub-districts (tambons), which are further subdivided into 154 administrative villages (mubans).

Local administration 
There are nine sub-district municipalities (thesaban tambons) in the district:
 Chorakhe Sam Phan consists of sub-district Chorakhe Sam Phan.
 Chedi consists of sub-district Chedi.
 Sa Yai Som consists of parts of the sub-district Sa Yai Som.
 U Thong consists of parts of the sub-district U Thong.
 Khun Phat Pheng consists of parts of the sub-district Sa Yai Som.
 Ban Don consists of sub-district Ban Don.
 Ban Khong consists of sub-district Ban Khong.
 Krachan consists of sub-district, Krachan.
 Thao U Thong consists of parts of sub-district U Thong.

There are six sub-district administrative organizations (SAO) in the district:
 Yung Thalai consists of sub-district Yung Thalai.
 Don Makluea consists of sub-district Don Makluea.
 Nong Ong consists of sub-district Nong Ong.
 Don Kha consists of sub-district Don Kha.
 Phlapphla Chai consists of sub-district Phlapphla Chai.
 Sa Phang Lan consists of sub-district Sa Phang Lan.

References

External links
amphoe.com

U Thong